Andrzej Mierzejewski (born 7 December 1960 in Chełmża) is a Polish retired road racing cyclist. He won the Tour de Pologne 1982, 1984 and 1988. He also competed in the road race at the 1988 Summer Olympics.

Palmarès

References

External links 

1960 births
Living people
Polish male cyclists
People from Chełmża
Cyclists at the 1988 Summer Olympics
Olympic cyclists of Poland
Sportspeople from Kuyavian-Pomeranian Voivodeship
21st-century Polish people